Andrew Radford may refer to:

Andy Radford (1944–2006),  Anglican Evangelical bishop and religious broadcaster.
Andrew Radford (linguist) (born 1945), British linguist.